Arthur Louis Moore (1849–24 March 1939) was an English glass-maker who specialised in stained glass windows.

Life
Moore was born in Brixton, London, one of nine children of a Clerkenwell clockmaker, and in 1871 he founded, along with a Mr. S. Gibbs, the London company of Gibbs and Moore, glassmakers.  In subsequent years Moore seems to have worked on his own, operating as A. L. Moore, Glass Painters and Decorators from premises at 89 Southampton Row, London.

Moore was joined by his son Charles Eustace Moore (1880–1956) in 1896, when the company became known as A. L. Moore and Son.  Their premises in Bedford Way, Russell Square, London were bombed in 1940, but under C. E. Moore the business continued until 1952.

Over the course of their careers the Moores produced over 1,000 windows in the UK and 100 overseas.

Moore died on 24 March 1939 in St Albans, Hertfordshire aged 89.

List of Stained Glass Works (incomplete)
England

 Christ Church, Cotmanhay, Derbyshire
 Church of St. John the Baptist, Newport, Devon
 St. Peter's Church, Dorchester, Dorset
 Church of St. Peter and St. Paul, Harlington, Greater London
 Hospital Church of St. Luke, Gosport, Hampshire
 All Saints' Church, Gurnard, Isle of Wight
 St. Paul's Church, Canterbury, Kent
 St. Mary's Church, Bottesford, Leicestershire
 St. Swithin's Church, Lincoln, Lincolnshire
 Church of St. John the Baptist, South Witham, Lincolnshire
 St. Andrew's Church, Brettenham, Norfolk
 St. Andrew's Church, Brinton, Norfolk
 Church of St. Mary, East Ruston, Norfolk
 Church of St. John the Evangelist, Dormansland, Surrey
 St. Philip's Church, Burwash, East Sussex
 St. Margaret's Church, Ditchling, East Sussex
 St. Mary's Church, Eastbourne, East Sussex
 All Saints' Church, Heathfield, East Sussex
 St. John the Baptist's Church, Hove, East Sussex
 Church of St. John the Baptist, Netherfield, East Sussex
 St. Nicholas' Church, Pevensey, East Sussex
 St. John the Evangelist's Church, Preston Village, East Sussex
 St. Luke's Church, Queen's Park, East Sussex
 St. Denys' Church, Rotherfield, East Sussex
 Church of St. Mary the Virgin, Salehurst, East Sussex
 Church of St. Michael and All Angels, Lancing, West Sussex
 Church of St. Michael and All Angels, Partridge Green, West Sussex
 Christ Church, Sayers Common, West Sussex
 Church of St. Andrew and St. Cuthman, Steyning, West Sussex
 St. Peter's Church, West Green, West Sussex
 St. Peter ad Vincula's Church, Wisborough Green, West Sussex
 St. Botolph's Church, Heene, West Sussex
 Holy Trinity Church, Trowbridge, Wiltshire
 St. Mary's Church, Goathland, North Yorkshire
 St. Mary's Church, Over Silton, North Yorkshire

Northern Ireland
 St. Columb's Cathedral, Derry, County Londonderry
 Carrick Church, Limavady, County Londonderry

Wales
 St. Mary's Church, Spittal, Pembrokeshire

Republic of Ireland
 St. Brigid's Cathedral, Kildare, County Kildare
 St. Paul's Church, Banagher, County Offaly

Gallery

References

External links

Pevensey: St Nicholas Church. Window by A. L. Moore - Annunciation
Pevensey: St Nicholas Church. Window by A. L. Moore - Resurrection
Brinton: St Andrew's Church. Window by A. L. Moore
Dormansland: St John the Evangelist. Window by A. L. Moore
Spittal: St Mary  Window by A. L. Moore

1849 births
1939 deaths
British stained glass artists and manufacturers
Date of birth missing